Denis Bernard (born December 6, 1957) is a Genie Award-winning Canadian film, television and theater actor and producer.

Biography
Born in Lac-Etchemin, Quebec, Bernard graduated from the Conservatoire d'art dramatique de Québec in 1980.

He is the cousin of actress Micheline Bernard.

Filmography

Actor

Producer

Awards
 Prix Paul-Hébert (2007)
 Prix Nicky-Roy (2006)
 Genie Award for Best Actor in a Supporting Role for his role of Phillipe Chevalier in Audition (L'Audition)
 5 nominations at the Gemeaux Awards
 6 nominations at the Soirée des Masques for Best Actor in a Leading Role and Best Director.

References

External links
 

1957 births
Living people
Canadian male film actors
Film directors from Quebec
Film producers from Quebec
Canadian male stage actors
Canadian male television actors
French Quebecers
Best Supporting Actor Genie and Canadian Screen Award winners
People from Chaudière-Appalaches